Gren Wells is a Kentucky-born filmmaker, screenwriter, and actress who works and resides in Los Angeles.

Early life
Wells was born in Louisville, Kentucky, and raised in Greenwich, Connecticut. After attending Manhattanville College in Purchase, New York, Wells moved to New York City, where she starred in six indie films over a two-year span, one of which, Man About Town, won Best Short Film at the 1997 Sundance Film Festival. After moving to Los Angeles, Wells became a stand-up comic and wrote her first feature script, A Little Bit of Heaven.

Career

Her first script, A Little Bit of Heaven, was sold to 20th Century Fox. This script later found a home at The Film Department and starred Kate Hudson, Gael García Bernal, Kathy Bates, Whoopi Goldberg, Rosemarie DeWitt, Lucy Punch, Romany Malco, and Peter Dinklage.

Her second film, The Road Within, was Wells' directorial debut. After premiering at the Los Angeles Film Festival it was acquired by Well Go USA. It stars Zoë Kravitz, Dev Patel, Robert Sheehan, Robert Patrick and Kyra Sedgwick and was released on April 17, 2015.

Awards
Wells was chosen as one of Varietys Top 10 Directors to Watch for 2014.

References

External links

 "Kate Hudson In 'A Little Bit Of Heaven' Trailer (VIDEO)" in The Huffington Post
 "Well Go USA Acquires Gren Wells' 'The Road Within'" at Deadline Hollywood
 "'The Road Within interviews' – Gren Wells and Robert Patrick" in Town Times

American women screenwriters
Living people
American women film producers
Film producers from New York (state)
American women film directors
Actresses from Louisville, Kentucky
Year of birth missing (living people)
Manhattanville College alumni
Screenwriters from Kentucky
Screenwriters from New York (state)
Film producers from Kentucky
21st-century American women